The Raymond Danowski Poetry Library is a poetry library at Emory University in Atlanta, Georgia, U.S.. It was established in 2004 after Raymond Danowski, the son-in-law of sculptor Henry Moore, donated his collection of "75,000 volumes of verse, believed to be the largest private library of 20th-century poetry in English," to the university.

References

External links
 

Emory University
Libraries in Georgia (U.S. state)
Libraries established in 2004
2004 establishments in Georgia (U.S. state)
Poetry organizations